The Grêmio Recreativo Escola de Samba Mocidade Independente de Padre Miguel is a samba school of the city of Rio de Janeiro, being located on Rua Coronel Tamarindo, in the neighborhood of Padre Miguel.

History 

The Mocidade was founded on 10 November 1955, by eight people: Silvio Trindade, Renato da Silva, Djalma Rosa, Olímpio Bonifácio (Bronquinha), Orozimbo de Oliveira (Seu Orozimbo), Garibaldi F. Lima, Felipe de Souza (Pavão), Ary de Lima e Alfredo Briggs. The first flag of the school was offered by Mrs. Gilda Faria Lima. The first queen of the school was Mrs. Neuza de Oliveira. The samba school participated for the first time, in an official parade, with the plot "O Baile das Rosas" ( "The Ball of Roses" ), when it got 5th place. In 1958, it was the champion of Group 2 with the plot "Apoteose ao Samba" ( "Apotheosis to the Samba" ). From 1959 forth, it took on Group 1 and did not anymore any relegation to the lower divisions.

In 1959, the bateria, under the expert Master André, gave for the first time the famous "paradinha" (the instant when the bateria of the school stops playing for some instants and during this period the samba-enredo is maintained with the song of the interpreters and of the members of the school) in front of the judging committee, maintaining the rhythm so that the school would continue developing. The folk would pass, later, to accompany such "bossa" with the shout of "Olé". During this period, the Mocidade was known as "a bateria that carried a school on its back", because the bateria was more known than the school itself, that only years later would become a school that would compete with the famous of that epoch (Portela, Império Serrano, Salgueiro and Mangueira).

In the year of 1974, Arlindo Rodrigues presented the plot "A Festa do Divino" ( "The Party of the Divine" ), getting 5th place. But on that same year the school could win the championship, had she not gotten 4 in clothings and 9 in harmony. The difference between Salgueiro and Mocidade was 6, therefore they would have tied only if Mocidade would have gotten 10. Even if they would tie, Salgueiro would win the championship because it got 10 in harmony.

From then on, the school stopped being known only because of the bateria, and became known as a good samba school. In 76, by irony, Mocidade tied second place, with Mangueira, and lost the decision for getting one point less in the so famous bateria. In 1979, still with Arlindo Rodrigues, Mocidade conquered for the first time the championship of the 1-A Division with "O Descobrimento do Brasil" ( "The Discovery of Brazil" ) in its debut appearance.

Next year, Fernando Pinto assumed the post of carnival producer and director, producing exceptional carnivals in Mocidade and becoming known as the most creative and ingenious carnival producer ever known.

In Fernando Pinto's first year in Mocidade, in 1980, the school conquered second place with the plot "Tropicália Maravilha" ( "Splendid Tropicália" ). In 1983, Mocidade received the banner of the best communication with the public with the plot "Como era verde o meu Xingu" ( "How was my Xingu Green" ).

In 1984 it became the Madrinha to the London School of Samba, the first samba school to be established in the UK. In 1989, Mocidade visited London to perform at the 3rd European Samba Encontro and formally adopt the LSS.

It advanced to the Special Group in 1990, and won three general championships since then. after years away from Champions Parade in youth gave a back on top, with a beautiful tribute to Morocco however in the final voting ended with vice-championship, which ratified title, due to error of a magistrate who used the Book Abre-Alas wrong. With this surprise the Mocidade Independente samba school thus won its fourth championship title, shared with Portela.

Classifications

The Independents of Padre Miguel
Andrezinho
Castor de Andrade
Dudu Nobre
Lucinha Nobre
Marcos Palmeira
Mestre André
Paulinho Mocidade
Tôco
Regina Casé
Carlos Alberto Parreira
Elza Soares
Rodrigo Santoro
Leandro Hassum
Monique Evans
Oswaldo de Oliveira
Dill Costa

Performers of the school

Arlindo Rodrigues
Andrea de Andrade
Claudia Leitte

Premiation Titles
Special Group: 1979, 1985, 1990, 1991, 1996 and 2017 (co-general champion)
Gold Standard (best school): 1983, 1991 and 1999
Standard Award (best drum kit): 1974, 1976, 1991, 1992, 2001 and 2018.

References

External links
Official website
London School Of Samba
 Samba Classes, Parades and private gigs with the colours and style of Mocidade.

Samba schools of Rio de Janeiro
1955 establishments in Brazil